Black Francis (born 1965), also known as Frank Black, is an American musician.

Frank Black may also refer to:

 Frank Black (album), the 1993 debut album of Frank Black
 Frank Black (character), protagonist of the TV series Millennium
 Frank Bunting Black (1869–1945), merchant and politician from New Brunswick, Canada
 Frank J. Black (1894–1968), American vaudeville composer and conductor of the Cities Service Concerts in the 1930s/40s
 Frank S. Black (1853–1913), governor of New York from 1897 to 1898

See also
 Francis Black (disambiguation)
 Frank Edwards (blues musician) (1909–2002), also known as Black Frank